Otočka  is a village in Gola, Koprivnica-Križevci County in northeastern Croatia. Its population in 2011 was 238.

References

Populated places in Koprivnica-Križevci County